The United Arab Emirates national handball team is the national handball team of United Arab Emirates.

Asian Championship record
1977 – 9th
1991 – 6th
1993 – 8th
1995 – 6th
2004 – 6th
2008 – 9th
2010 – 11th
2012 – 7th
2014 – 4th
2016 – 7th
2018 – 7th
2020 – 5th
2022 – 9th

Squad
 1 Abdulla Alsaffar (C)
 3 Mohammed Almutawa
 5 Essa Mohammad
 7 Mohammed Albaloushi
 8 Yousuf Bilal
 10 Rahma Almansouri
 11 Shehab Alblooshi
 12 Mohammad Altaher
 16 Abderrahman Khamis
 17 Waheed Alblooshi
 19 Marzooq Albaloushi
 22 Ahmed Mohamed
 23 Khamis Alsuwaidi
 33 Ahmed Aldhanhani
 44 Faisal Alblooshi
 77 Abdulla Albaloushi
 88 Abdulhameed Mohamed

Staff
Team Manager: Khalid Khamis Alsuwaidi
Head coach: Khalid Albaloushi
Assistant coach: Fernando Gonzalez
GK Coach: Marko Selakovic
Physio: Sima Spasevski

References

External links

IHF profile

Men's national handball teams
National sports teams of the United Arab Emirates